Michael Efroimsky is an American astronomer  of Russian origin.
His research interests are in celestial mechanics and relativity. 
He is working as a Research Scientist at the US Naval Observatory in Washington DC.

Michael Efroimsky is a member of the International Astronomical Union and the American Astronomical Society (AAS).

In 2008 - 2009, he served as the Chair of the Division on Dynamical Astronomy of the AAS.

With Sergei Kopeikin and George Kaplan, Michael Efroimsky co-authored a book on the relativistic celestial mechanics of the Solar System.

With Benoit Noyelles, Julien Frouard and Valeri V. Makarov, Michael Efroimsky co-authored a theory 

explaining the origin of the present state of rotation of the planet Mercury, a so-called 3:2 spin-orbit resonance.

With Amirhossein Bagheri, Amir Khan, and other colleagues, Michael Efroimsky co-authored a theory explaining the origin and orbital evolution of Phobos and Deimos, the satellites of Mars. 

According to this theory, Phobos and Deimos are remnants of a common progenitor, a larger protomoon destroyed by a collision with a planetesimal.  

Michael Efroimsky also published translations from classical Russian poetry.

Notes

External links
personal webpage

Year of birth missing (living people)
Living people
American astronomers